The Wilfandel Club is the oldest African-American women's club in Los Angeles. The group was founded in 1945 with the goal of promoting civic betterment, philanthropic endeavors, and general culture. They maintain a clubhouse, sponsor a scholarship, and hold monthly meetings, which feature guest speakers.

The club was established in 1945 by black women active in the community, including Della Mae Givens, wife of architect Paul Williams.

The Wilfandel House, which is located at 3425 West Adams Blvd Los Angeles CA 90018, an area commonly known as Arlington Heights, is said to have been built in 1922 by silent film star Ramon Novarro for his brother.

Once the Wilfandel Club members purchased the building, The Wilfandel Club house became a popular venue for holding farewell parties for young African-American men who went off to fight America’s wars, or for young people leaving to attend college. The Wilfandel Club house was one of the few integrated public meeting places in Los Angeles during the 1950s.

The club house is still used today by the members of the Wilfandel Club for meetings, weddings and other functions. It is equipped with a full kitchen.

Wilfandel members also have raised thousands of dollars to support the American Cancer Society, the Exceptional Children’s Foundation, the Foundation for the Junior Blind, as well as the National Association for the Advancement of Colored People. For its contributions to the community, the club is the recipient of the Community Service Award, presented by the California State Attorney General. Today, Wilfandel Club members total more than 60 African-American women.

Bessie Bruington Burke was a Wilfandel Club member.  She received her teaching credentials in 1911 and soon became the first Black teacher in the Los Angeles City School District.

References

External links

African-American organizations
Organizations based in Los Angeles
Organizations established in 1945
Women's clubs in the United States
Women in California
African-American history of California